Orange Then Blue is an avant-garde big band from Boston, Massachusetts led by drummer George Schuller. Several well known jazz musicians have performed with the group as either members or guests, including trumpeters Dave Douglas and Cuong Vu, saxophonist Chris Speed, and bassist Reid Anderson. George Schuller is the son of Gunther Schuller.

Discography
 Music for Jazz Orchestra (GM, 1986)
 Where Were You? (GM, 1990)
 Jumpin' in the Future (GM, 1990)
 Funkallero (GM, 1991)
 While You Were Out (GM, 1992)
 Hold the Elevator: Live in Europe and Other Haunts (GM, 1999)

See also
 List of experimental big bands

References

External links
 Review of While You Were Out at All About Jazz

Experimental big bands
Progressive big bands
Post-bop ensembles
Avant-garde jazz ensembles
Big bands